Trichopodus (formerly included in Trichogaster) is a genus of tropical freshwater labyrinth fish of the gourami family found in Southeast Asia. Gouramis of the genus Trichopodus are closely related to those of Trichogaster (formerly Colisa); species of both genera have long, thread-like pelvic fins (known as "feelers" in the aquarium trade) used to sense the environment.

Along with the Trichogaster species, Trichopodus gouramis are popular in the aquarium trade. The three spot gourami (T. trichopterus), with its several aquarium variants, each known by a different trade name, is perhaps the most common aquarium gourami. Trichopodus species are also used as food fish in its native range. The snakeskin gourami, in particular, is one of the top five aquacultured freshwater fish in Thailand.

Etymology
The name Trichopodus is composed of the Ancient Greek words θρίξ (thríx) which means hair and πούς (poús) which means foot.

Species
There are currently 6 recognized species in this genus: 
 Trichopodus cantoris Günther 1861
 Trichopodus leerii Bleeker, 1852 (Pearl gourami)
 Trichopodus microlepis Günther, 1861 (Moonlight gourami)
 Trichopodus pectoralis Regan, 1910 (Snakeskin gourami)
 Trichopodus poptae Low, H. H. Tan & Britz, 2014 
 Trichopodus trichopterus (Pallas, 1770) (Three spot gourami)

References

 
Luciocephalinae
Freshwater fish genera
Taxa named by Bernard Germain de Lacépède